Salamis was a nymph in Greek mythology, the daughter of the river-god Asopus and Metope, daughter of Ladon, another river god. She was sister to Corcyra, Sinope, Aegina, Peirene, Cleone, Thebe, Tanagra, Thespia, Asopis, Ornea, Chalcis (Euboea), Harpina, Antiope, Nemea, Plataea (Oeroe), Pelagon (Pelasgus) and Ismenus.

Mythology 
Along with her sisters Corcyra and Euboea, Salamis also shared their fate after they were all carried away by Poseidon from their father. The god took her to the island which was named after her by Cychreus, their son who became the first king of the island.

In some accounts, she became the mother of Saracon by Zeus.

Notes

References 

 Apollodorus, The Library with an English Translation by Sir James George Frazer, F.B.A., F.R.S. in 2 Volumes, Cambridge, MA, Harvard University Press; London, William Heinemann Ltd. 1921. ISBN 0-674-99135-4. Online version at the Perseus Digital Library. Greek text available from the same website.
 Diodorus Siculus, The Library of History translated by Charles Henry Oldfather. Twelve volumes. Loeb Classical Library. Cambridge, Massachusetts: Harvard University Press; London: William Heinemann, Ltd. 1989. Vol. 3. Books 4.59–8. Online version at Bill Thayer's Web Site
 Diodorus Siculus, Bibliotheca Historica. Vol 1-2. Immanel Bekker. Ludwig Dindorf. Friedrich Vogel. in aedibus B. G. Teubneri. Leipzig. 1888-1890. Greek text available at the Perseus Digital Library.
 Pausanias, Description of Greece with an English Translation by W.H.S. Jones, Litt.D., and H.A. Ormerod, M.A., in 4 Volumes. Cambridge, MA, Harvard University Press; London, William Heinemann Ltd. 1918. . Online version at the Perseus Digital Library
 Pausanias, Graeciae Descriptio. 3 vols. Leipzig, Teubner. 1903.  Greek text available at the Perseus Digital Library.
 Pseudo-Clement, Recognitions from Ante-Nicene Library Volume 8, translated by Smith, Rev. Thomas. T. & T. Clark, Edinburgh. 1867. Online version at theio.com

Naiads
Nymphs
Children of Asopus
Women of Poseidon
Divine women of Zeus
Salaminian mythology